Haris is a Palestinian town located in the Salfit Governorate of the State of Palestine, in the northern West Bank, 24 kilometers Southwest of Nablus. According to the Palestinian Central Bureau of Statistics, it had a population of 3,427 approximately in mid-year 2007.

Location
It is bordered by Kifl Haris to the east, Salfit and Bruqin to the south, Sarta and Qarawat Bani Hassan to the west, and Deir Istiya to the north.

History
Sherds from the Mamluk era have been found here. In 1359 it is mentioned by Ibn Kadi as a place bought by the Sultan.

Ottoman era
In 1517, the village was included in the Ottoman empire with the rest of Palestine, and potsherds from the early Ottoman period have been found. It appeared in the 1596 tax-records as Harit, located in the Nahiya of Jabal Qubal, part of the Sanjak of Nablus. The population was 21 households, all Muslim. They paid a fixed tax sum of 12,000 akçe, in addition to taxes on "agnan", bee hives, and occasional revenues; a total of 13,300 akçe.

In 1838, Edward Robinson noted it as a village, Harith, in the Jurat Merda district, south of Nablus.

In 1870 Guérin observed here a building used as a mosque, divided into three naves separated by marble columns of different sizes, and evidently ancient. 'On a neighbouring Tell, which commands the village, are the ruins of an ancient tower. The spot is now planted with olives. Two ancient tombs and several cisterns cut in the rock once belonged to the ancient city which stood here.'

In 1882, the PEF's Survey of Western Palestine (SWP) described Haris as "a medium sized village on high ground built of stone, and supplied by cisterns. It has rock-cut tombs and is probably an ancient site; there are fine olive groves round it."

British Mandate era
In the 1922 census of Palestine conducted by the British Mandate authorities, Haris (called: Hares) had a population of 285, all Muslims,   increasing in the 1931 census to 394, except for one Christian all were Muslim, in a total of 99 houses.

In the 1945 statistics the population was 540, all Muslims, while the total land area was 8,391 dunams, according to an official land and population survey. Of this, 1,545 were used for plantations and irrigable land, 1,341 for cereals, while 21 dunams were classified as built-up areas.

Jordanian era
In the wake of the 1948 Arab–Israeli War, and after the 1949 Armistice Agreements, Haris came under Jordanian rule.

In 1961, the population was 726.

Post-1967
Since the Six-Day War in 1967, Haris has been held under Israeli occupation. 

After the 1995 accords, about 6% of village land was classified as Area B land, while the remaining 94% was classified as Area C.

Loss of land
Haris has been directly affected by the construction of the wall on the West Bank and the settlements surrounding Ariel and the Barkan Industrial Park. ARIJ, a Palestinian research institute lists the losses as follows:

In late October 2014, Israel expropriated a further 20 dunams (5 acres) of land, near the Israeli settlement of Barkan.

On May 24, 2020, Israeli settlers from the Revava settlement, located on the lands of Haris, northwest of Salfit Governorate, uprooted and stolen more than 150–200 olive trees. The Palestinian Colonization and Wall Resistance Commission began performing Peaceful Sit-in every Friday in the lands of Haris since May 29, 2020.

References

Bibliography

External links
   Welcome To Haris
Survey of Western Palestine, Map 14:  IAA, Wikimedia commons 
Haris Village (Fact Sheet), Applied Research Institute–Jerusalem, ARIJ
Haris Village Profile, ARIJ
Haris, aerial photo, ARIJ
Development Priorities and Needs in Haris, ARIJ

Towns in Salfit Governorate
Salfit Governorate
Municipalities of the State of Palestine